Despedida de Solteiro (English: Bachelor Party) is a Brazilian telenovela produced and broadcast by TV Globo in 1992.

Cast

Special participation 
 Gabriela Alves - Salete
 Geórgia Gomide - cartomante
 Mário Lago - Padre
 Paulo Goulart - Delegado
 Barbara Dewet - Lenita (child)
 Lafayette Galvão - Padre
 Chico Tenreiro
 Ênio Santos
 Felipe Carone
 Germano Filho
 Cleyde Blota
 Alexandre Lippiani - Roger
 Lina Fróes
 Newton Martins - Jorge
 Naura Schneider - Beth
 Mário Cardoso
 David Cardoso - Corumbá
 Pierre Bittencourt - Sérgio Santarém (child)
 Buza Ferraz - Yan
 José Augusto Branco - Dr. Cintra
 Letícia Spiller - Debbie
 Leila Lopes - Carol
 Alice de Carli - Janete
 Jussara Calmon - Dorinha
 Egon Júnior - Guto
 Lu Frota - Fafá
 Karina Mello - Simone
 Vicente Barcellos - Damasceno

References

External links 
 Despedida de Solteiro at Memória Globo
 

1992 telenovelas
Brazilian telenovelas
TV Globo telenovelas
1992 Brazilian television series debuts
1993 Brazilian television series endings
Portuguese-language telenovelas